Ubir (Kubiri) is an Oceanic language of Oro Province, Papua New Guinea.

External links 
Daily Prayers, Holy Communion and Devotions in Ubir (1920) digitized by Richard Mammana
Paradisec has a number of collections that include Ubir language materials.

References

Nuclear Papuan Tip languages
Languages of Oro Province